The 2008 Ulster Senior Hurling Championship was the 63rd installment of the annual Ulster Senior Hurling Championship held under the auspices of the Ulster GAA. Antrim were the defending champions and successfully claimed their ninth consecutive title, beating finalists Down.

Format 

The draw for the Ulster championship was seeded, and took place in a staggered single elimination format. Antrim and Down received byes until the semifinal, Armagh and Derry to the quarterfinal and London and Donegal to the second round. All four other teams entered in the first round. 

This was the last year where a winning team was granted entry from the Ulster Championship to the 2008 All-Ireland Senior Hurling Championship proper. Antrim entered that competition through the Qualifier series. From 2009 onwards, the Ulster championship continued as a stand alone tournament

The other Ulster teams took part in lower tier competitions, such as the 2008 Christy Ring Cup, the second tier All-Ireland hurling championship.

The number of teams in the championship grew enormously from 2007. The entry for 2008, ten, was a record, and for many marked a first foray back into senior championship hurling. All nine historic counties of Ulster took part, in addition to London.

In order to avoid mismatches, the draw was set so that the weaker counties were not faced with the prospect of facing regional powers Antrim or Down at an early stage; instead all the other counties took part in a series of elimination matches for the right to meet Antrim or down in the semifinal.

Teams

Bracket

Box scores 

Ulster Hurling Senior
Ulster Senior Hurling Championship